Juan Hernández Salas is a Mexican former professional tennis player.

Biography
Hernández comes from a large family of tennis players, which includes his sister Claudia, who played in the Federation Cup for Mexico.

In 1981 he represented Mexico in a home Davis Cup tie against Switzerland, held in Tijuana. The tie was a World Group relegation playoff and was won by Mexico, with Hernández losing his dead rubber singles match to Ivan Dupasquier.

A national champion in 1982, Hernández made his only grand slam main draw appearance when he played in the doubles at the 1982 French Open, partnering American Mark Freedman.

His best performance on the professional tour came at the 1983 Monterrey Cup, where he reached the quarter-final stage of the singles, with wins over Steve Meister and Andy Andrews.

Challenger titles

Doubles: (1)

See also
List of Mexico Davis Cup team representatives

Notes

References

External links
 
 
 

Year of birth missing (living people)
Living people
Mexican male tennis players
20th-century Mexican people